Arizona is an unincorporated community in Claiborne Parish, Louisiana, United States. Arizona is located at

History
Arizona was founded in the 1860s and was named after the Arizona Territory.

G. L. P. Wren, a member of both houses of the Louisiana State Legislature during the 19th century, taught school in Arizona prior to the American Civil War.

References

Unincorporated communities in Claiborne Parish, Louisiana
Unincorporated communities in Louisiana